Unleash the Fire is the fifteenth studio album by the American heavy metal band Riot, now called Riot V, released on August 27, 2014 through Steamhammer Records in Europe. It is Riot's first album not featuring long-time guitarist Mark Reale.

Track listing

Personnel

Band members 
 Todd Michael Hall - lead vocals
 Mike Flyntz - guitar
 Nick Lee - guitar
 Don Van Stavern - bass
 Frank Gilchriest - drums

Production 
 Bruno Ravel - production, mastering
 Joshua Block - co-production, engineer

References

2014 albums
Riot V albums
SPV/Steamhammer albums